Daniel Daly Young (19 April 1899 – 1970) was a British comedian and film actor. He featured in a number of Mancunian Films productions often appearing with Frank Randle.

Selected filmography
 Dodging the Dole (1936)
 Calling All Crooks (1938)
 Somewhere in England (1940)
 Somewhere in Camp (1942)
 Somewhere on Leave (1943)
 Demobbed (1944)
 Under New Management (1946)
 Holidays with Pay (1948)
 Cup-tie Honeymoon (1948)
 School for Randle (1949)
 Over the Garden Wall (1950)
 It's a Grand Life (1953)

References

External links

1899 births
1970 deaths
British male film actors
British comedians
20th-century British male actors
British male comedy actors
20th-century British comedians